State Trunk Highway 77 (often called Highway 77, STH-77 or WIS 77) is a state highway in the U.S. state of Wisconsin. It runs east–west in northwest Wisconsin from the Minnesota border near Danbury to the Michigan border in Hurley. The highway was first designated in 1920 and was extended to the current routing sometime between 1948 and 1956.

Route description

The highway begins at the Minnesota state line along the St. Croix River as a continuation of MIN 48 and runs east from it. The highway passes by County Trunk Highway (CTH) F in Danbury and begins a concurrency with WIS 35 in the east of Danbury. The concurrency runs northeastward along the St. Croix River until the highway leaves the concurrency and runs eastward from it. The highway passes by a large amount of lakes and then curves to the north, meeting US 53 and its business route in Minong. It then runs east from it, intersecting with CTH-G. Between CTH-G and CTH-M, the highway runs southeast and crosses a railroad. The highway then runs eastward towards a concurrency with WIS 27.

After its concurrency with WIS 27 starts, the highway meets Smith Lake and curves to the south, running towards Hayward. After entering Hayward, it meets US 63 and WIS 27 follows it, ending its concurrency with the highway. After intersecting with US 63, the highway runs north of Hayward Lake. East of Hayward, the highway runs northeastward. It passes to the northwest of Round Lake and runs around the west and north of McClaine Lake, and then runs east from it. The highway then enters the Chequamegon-Nicolet National Forest and passes by more lakes in the National Forest, running northeastward to Clam Lake. From there, the highway runs east.

Soon after the highway exits the National Forest, it begins a concurrency with WIS 13 and runs northward towards Mellen, and runs through another section of the National Forest. The highway enters Mellen along Main Street and exits the concurrency, running along Lake Drive before running east from Lake Drive just north of Tannery Town. The highway then runs east-northeast along a railroad, passing through Tyler Forks, Rouse, and Upson, where it meets WIS 122. The highway continues to follow the railroad before it ends, at which point the highway enters Hurley and terminates at US 51 west of the Michigan state line along the Montreal River.

History

The highway was first designated between Mellen to Hurley in northeast Wisconsin. In 1922, a highway linking Minong and Hayward, to be designated WIS 124, was constructed, and it was open by 1923. In 1924, the highway was extended west to Hayward and the section west of WIS 35 was designated was WIS 152. Sometime between 1948 and 1956, the highway was extended west to the Minnesota state line. The former WIS 124 (by then WIS 27) and WIS 152 were redesignated as parts of the highway. In 1956, the only section that was not part of a concurrency that was paved was near the eastern terminus in Hurley.

Major intersections

See also

References

External links

077
Transportation in Burnett County, Wisconsin
Transportation in Washburn County, Wisconsin
Transportation in Sawyer County, Wisconsin
Transportation in Ashland County, Wisconsin
Transportation in Iron County, Wisconsin